"Champagne for my real friends, real pain for my sham friends" is a pun on an antimetabole, a quote often attributed to the Irish painter Francis Bacon (1909–1992) or the American musician Tom Waits (born 1949), but which is recorded as a toast dating to at least the nineteenth century. 

Other examples of its use include:

"Mr. Jorrocks then called upon the company in succession for a toast, a song, or a sentiment. Nimrod gave, 'The Royal Staghounds'; Crane gave, 'Champagne to our real friends, and real pain to our sham friends.'" Jorrocks's Jaunts and Jollities (1838), ch. 12, by R. S. Surtees 
the title of an episode of One Tree Hill (season 3)
a song on the 2005 album From Under the Cork Tree by Fall Out Boy
a repeated line in the song "This One's for You" by Therapy? on their 2001 album Shameless
the chorus of Faderhead's 2014 song "Champagne and real pain"
a line that Edward Norton's character says in the 2002 Spike Lee film 25th Hour.
a line in Mike Cross's song "Dear Boss" on the 1985 album Solo at Midnight
a line delivered as a toast by actor Russell Johnson from the 1961 TV series Thriller, season 1, episode 16, "The Hungry Glass", based on a story by Robert Bloch
a line said by the character Dave Rose in the show Happy Endings, episode "Dave of the Dead"
a line said by the character Marnie in the show Girls, season 5 episode 6
a line by JP and his brother Tomothy while drinking champagne in British TV show Fresh Meat series 4 episode 6
in Bojack Horseman season 3 episode 8, Bradley Hitler-Smith brings champagne to a party saying, "champagne for my real friends!"
the title of a 2010 album by Alan Oldham
a bungled line in the song "Fake Champagne" by Seth Sentry on his 2015 album Strange New Past
a line said by the character Harley Quinn in the comic book Harley Quinn volume 3, issue #77

See also

References

Quotations
Francis Bacon (artist)
Tom Waits